{{DISPLAYTITLE:Theta1 Orionis A}}

Theta1 Orionis A (θ1 Ori A) is a variable trinary star in the constellation Orion.  Its apparent magnitude range is 6.72 to 7.65 with a period of 65.432 days.  It is one of the main stars in The Trapezium in Orion, along with B, C, and D, as well as the fainter E.

Variability

θ1 Orionis A varies in brightness, showing dips from magnitude 6.72 to 7.65 every 65.432 days.  These are caused by eclipses of a close binary pair.  θ1 Orionis A has been assigned the variable star designation V1016 Orionis.

System
θ1 Orionis A is a star system with three known members. Components A1 and A2 are separated by around 0.2 ", while A1 is itself a spectroscopic binary with two stars separated by about 1 au.

θ1 Orionis A1 is an eclipsing binary but the secondary is not detected in the spectrum and is far less luminous than the primary.  The secondary has been proposed to be a T Tauri star, possibly of spectral class A.  The orbit is not well-defined but appears to be eccentric.

θ1 Orionis A2 is approximately one magnitude fainter than A1 and 0.2" away.  This corresponds to a projected separation of 90 AU.  The relative motion of the two stars has been measured and they are slowly getting closer together but it has not been possible to derive an orbit.  The relative motion of the two stars could simply be a straight line, but it is calculated that they are gravitationally bound.

References

External links

Orion (constellation)
B-type main-sequence stars
Orionis, Theta1 A
Orionis, 41 A
Algol variables
Triple star systems
026220
037020
1893
Durchmusterung objects
Orionis, V1016